Lawrence Riel Yew (January 17, 1942 – April 18, 1998) was a trapper, fisherman and political figure in Saskatchewan. He represented Cumberland from 1982 to 1986 in the Legislative Assembly of Saskatchewan as a New Democratic Party (NDP) member. Yew was the first aboriginal MLA elected in Saskatchewan.

He was born in Beauval, Saskatchewan. He served as administrator for Pinehouse. Yew was executive assistant to the minister of the Department of Northern Saskatchewan. He served as a municipal councillor in northern Saskatchewan before entering provincial politics. In 1964, he married Victoria Elizabeth Iron. He died at the age of 56 in 1998.

References 

Saskatchewan New Democratic Party MLAs
1942 births
1998 deaths
Canadian Métis people